Scolinos is a surname. Notable people with the surname include:

 John Scolinos (1918–2009), American baseball and football coach
 Tasia Scolinos (born 1972), American attorney and politician